The Huaraz Province is one of twenty provinces of the Ancash Region in Peru. It was created on August 5, 1857 during the presidency of Ramón Castilla.  Geographically, the province is located over the Callejón de Huaylas and the western slopes of the Cordillera Negra.

The Regional Museum of Archaeology is located in the Huaraz district.

Geography 
The Cordillera Blanca and the Cordillera Negra traverse the province. Some of the highest peaks of the province are Pucaranra, Chinchey, Tocllaraju and Huantsán. Other mountains are listed below:

At 30 kilometres (20 mi) from Huaraz, by the route Huaraz–Casma that crosses the Cordillera Negra, there is a place named Punta Callan in the summit of this mountain range. It offers a panoramic sight of the Cordillera Blanca and the Callejón de Huaylas.

Political division
Huaraz is divided into twelve districts, which are the following:
 Cochabamba 
 Colcabamba 
 Huanchay 
 Huaraz 
 Independencia 
 Jangas 
 La Libertad 
 Olleros 
 Pampas 
 Pariacoto 
 Pira 
 Tarica

Ethnic groups 
The province is inhabited by indigenous and mestizo citizens of Quechua descent. Spanish is the language which the majority of the population (63.43%) learnt to speak in childhood, 36.28% of the residents started speaking using the Quechua language (2007 Peru Census).

See also
 Administrative divisions of Peru
 Pallqaqucha
 Tullpaqucha

References

External links
  Official web site of the Huaraz Province

Provinces of the Ancash Region